Fossetts Park is the provisional name for a football stadium proposed to be built in Southend-on-Sea, Essex, England as a new home for Southend United F.C. to replace its current town centre Roots Hall Stadium. The name may be changed if sponsorship for the stadium is secured. Initial proposals for the new stadium emerged in 1998; planning permission was applied for, and later confirmed by Southend Council, in 2008 but at that time the scheme depended entirely on financing from a proposed adjacent retail and leisure development, which failed to happen. In 2020, a new deal was agreed, based instead on delivery of 1300 new homes, split between the Fossetts Farm site (c. 800) and Roots Hall (c. 500). However, council planning approval for homes and a 16,226 stadium had still not been given in February 2023.

History

Financial preparation (1998-1999)
Billericay-based property development company Martin Dawn PLC and Delancey Estates, together forming South Eastern Leisure (SEL), took control of Southend United in November 1998. Ron Martin said his company was "committed to a successful football club on and off the field, both of which can be enhanced by the future possibility of a new stadium and improved facilities for all." SEL bought the club and its centrally located Roots Hall ground for £4m from then chairman Vic Jobson, who at the time owned 55% of the issued share capital of the club. Jobson had previously sold part of the ground's South Bank for housing, and SEL's plan was to continue the redevelopment and move the club to a proposed 16,000-seat stadium in a leisure redevelopment in the northern part of Southend.

In March 1999 Southend United's Roots Hall ground was sold for £4 million to Martin Dawn subsidiary Roots Hall Limited to clear a £3.87 million debt; the club would lease back the ground at an annual rent of £400,000. John Main had replaced Jobson as Southend United chairman, and said: "There is no question of Roots Hall being bulldozed to the ground before we have relocated to a new stadium – this club will not be homeless." But disgruntled club shareholders demanded the resignations of several board members at an EGM called to rubber-stamp the sale, claiming that they should stand down for allowing the club to slip so dangerously into the red and forcing the sale of the club's only real asset. "These board members should be made to resign after displaying their utter incompetence by allowing the company to trade in an insolvent situation," exclaimed one annoyed shareholder.

In September 1999 Southend United said plans for a new multimillion-pound stadium would be presented to council chiefs within weeks with chairman John Main confident that the club would be given permission to start construction early in the new millennium. "The council have been very supportive and we hope that the planning application passes through successfully", said Main. "If it does we can look forward to moving into a new state-of-the-art home within the next few years."

Planning application and setbacks (2000-2002)
Plans for the new 15,000-seat stadium were put on hold in February 2000 after it was discovered that an ancient  Bronze Age burial ground entered onto the planned site. By March 2000 supporters frustration grew as the club continued to fail to meet promised planning application submission dates. The Southend United Supporters Club Trust (SUSCT) observed that the club was running out of time. "We're no nearer to getting a new home now than we were 12 months ago, which is very worrying because we are running out of time fast," said chairman Trevor Bashford. Members of Southend Council were equally eager to see some progress. In late May 2000 Council chief executive George Krawiec threw his weight behind the proposals but admitted that he would like to see some progress made on the planning front. "We await both eagerly and anxiously Southend United's planning application so we can look at it properly within the correct guidelines," said Krawiec.

Plans for a £12.5 million 16,000-seat stadium on the Fossets Farm site were submitted in July 2000, but the proposal fell through almost immediately after a rival property development company revealed that it actually owned much of the site.

Two months later, in September 2000, Southend United came to the brink of extinction after a £400,000 demand from the Inland Revenue went unpaid, amid boardroom turmoil. Main had been uneasy about the club having to pay £400,000 annual rent to its new owners, and about Ron Martin's motives ("How can he argue for the club, particularly against SEL, if he jointly owns SEL and his main interest is in making money from the property deal?"). Main was ousted as a condition of a £1.5m investment by Delancy Estates, and replaced by Martin.

Speaking to shareholders at the club's December 2000 AGM, Ron Martin said that the proposal for a 16,000 capacity ground should go before the planning committee on 7 February 2001 and that he was "confident" that both the football club and local council were on the same wavelength.

However, the council decided to defer the decision for a further three months. Fans set up an action group 'Save Our Southend' to prevent their club from becoming homeless or even extinct. "We want our football team's future to be protected in the borough of Southend," said SOS spokesman Trevor Bashford. Even former boss David Webb voiced his concerns: "I'm still very sceptical about what will happen to the club if the stadium doesn't come off."

In June 2001 the club pulled out of a planning meeting set to make a decision on the Fossetts Farm proposal, citing that it "needed more time to assess the content of its project". SEL UK, the club's joint owner, later declared that it wanted to sell the club: "The directors are currently seeking to sell the company's interest in Southend United" said the auditors' report. Ron Martin said the joint owners of Martin Dawn and Delancey were not about to cut and run: "The position is quite clear – Martin Dawn and Delancey are only interested in the longevity of Southend United." In August 2001, former chairman John Main warned fans that the proposal was not "financially viable" and that "there will be no stadium at Fossetts Farm and the future of the football club remains at Roots Hall."

In September 2001 it was claimed that Southend United could remain at Roots Hall after a deal was proposed between property developers Lansbury and Delancey. Negotiations continued into 2002, with a deal announced in December 2002, allowing the club to remain at Roots Hall for three years while plans for Fossetts Farm were developed.

Further plans (2006-2007)
In March 2006, Martin bought out Delancy's shareholding in Southend United, and planned a new Council submission about a combined 17,000-seat stadium, retail and leisure development at Fossett's Farm. On 3 August 2006 local media reported that work was to start in 2007 on a £25 million 22,000 superstadium. Martin stated that "plans are at an advanced stage now" and added that they would be submitted in late September 2006 after which there will be a 16-week public consultation. The new ground has been designed by Populous, formerly known as HOK Sport.

In January 2007, Southend Borough Council gave planning permission for a new 22,000-seater stadium at Fossetts Farm, with Rochford District Council following suit 24 hours later. On 6 March 2008, permission to develop Fossetts Farm was given by the government.

Commercial deal (2020-present)
However, it took a further 12 years before firm plans emerged for the development, with a switch from retail and leisure to residential provision; in April 2020, a deal was agreed between Southend United, the borough council and social housing provider Citizen Housing. Established in 2018, Citizen Housing is a 50/50 joint venture between Lenrose Housing and Allied Commercial Exporters, the UK investment vehicle of property tycoons, the Dellal family; it is fronted by Ron Martin's son, Jack Martin.

More than 1,300 homes, including 400 affordable ones, will be built in the area around the stadium at Fossetts Farm; plans for the retail area had been axed. The local authority will gain long-term income from managing 500 homes on the current Roots Hall site and 800 surrounding the new stadium.

The development was expected to proceed despite Southend United's May 2021 relegation from the Football League. In September 2021, a vote on plans for the scheme by the council's development control committee was reported to be imminent. The plans were approved in October 2021, subject to Government approval anticipated in early 2022; the 22,000-capacity stadium would incorporate a 107-bed hotel and high-rise residential blocks of 182 homes on two corners.

Work started on the £2million groundworks to develop the new training ground pitches and players' car parking in July 2022.

In September 2022, after the club had been unable to get a hotel operator onboard, plans to build a hotel at the proposed new stadium were dropped in favour of 42 additional homes, taking the total to 224 homes. A revised planning application also outlined plans to lower the stadium capacity to 16,226. In February 2023, applications for the additional homes and smaller stadium were both still to be decided by Southend Council as information had not been provided by the club.

References

 

Buildings and structures in Southend-on-Sea
Sports venues in Essex
Southend United F.C.
Proposed football venues in England